Savignia yasudai is a species of sheet weaver found in Japan. It was described by Saito in 1986.

References

Linyphiidae
Spiders of Asia
Spiders described in 1986